Lanthionine is a nonproteinogenic amino acid with the chemical formula (HOOC-CH(NH2)-CH2-S-CH2-CH(NH2)-COOH). It is typically formed by a cysteine residue and a dehydrated serine residue. Despite its name, lanthionine does not contain the element lanthanum.

Background

In 1941, lanthionine was first isolated by treating wool with sodium carbonate.  It was found to be a sulfur-containing amino acid; accordingly it was given the name lanthionine [wool (Latin: Lana), sulfur (Greek: theîon)]. Lanthionine was first synthesized by alkylation of cysteine with β-chloroalanine.  Lanthionines are found widely in nature.  They have been isolated from human hair, lactalbumin, and feathers.  Lanthionines have also been found in bacterial cell walls and are the components of a group of gene-encoded peptide antibiotics called lantibiotics, which includes nisin (a food preservative), subtilin, epidermin (effective against Staphylococcus and Streptococcus), and ancovenin (an enzyme inhibitor).

Preparation

A variety of syntheses of lanthionine have been published including sulfur extrusion from cystine, ring opening of serine β-lactone, and hetero-conjugate addition of cysteine to dehydroalanine.  The sulfur extrusion method is, however, the only pathway for lanthionine that has been employed in the total synthesis of a lantibiotic.

Biosynthesis of the lanthionine bridge in peptidic natural products can be accomplished through a number of different pathways. For example, the lanthionine bridges in the antibiotic nisin are the result of a dedicated dehydratase (NisB) and a dedicated cyclase (NisC).

References

Sulfur amino acids
Thioethers
Non-proteinogenic amino acids